Gocho Milev (born 20 October 1944) is a Bulgarian equestrian. He competed in two events at the 1972 Summer Olympics.

References

1944 births
Living people
Bulgarian male equestrians
Olympic equestrians of Bulgaria
Equestrians at the 1972 Summer Olympics
People from Dobrich Province
20th-century Bulgarian people